Peter Kott (born 1949) is a former Republican state representative for District 17 serving Eagle River, Alaska, in the Alaska Legislature for seven terms, from 1993 until 2007. He was Speaker of the House during his sixth term in 2003–2004.

On May 4, 2007, Kott was one of three former or current legislators (the others being Bruce Weyhrauch (R-Juneau) and Vic Kohring (R-Wasilla)) arrested and charged with bribery, extortion, and other corruption-related charges involving allegations of soliciting and receiving money and favors from VECO Corporation executives in return for their votes on an oil tax law favored by the VECO. Kott pleaded not guilty to all charges. On September 25, 2007, a federal jury found Kott guilty on three of the four charges brought against him.  He was acquitted on the charge of wire fraud.  On December 7, 2007, he was sentenced to six years in prison and fined $10,000.

However, he was released on bond in June 2009 while a court reviews the case. The conviction was vacated and in 2011 Kott agreed to plead guilty in exchange for being sentenced to time served and conditions on his release.

See also
 Alaska political corruption probe
 Public Integrity Section

References

 United States v. Peter Kott and Bruce Weyrauch. Indictment. Case 3:07-cr-00056-JWS-JDR. Filed May 3, 2007, in United States District Court, District of Alaska, Anchorage, Alaska. Retrieved on 2007-05-14.

External links
 "Alaska Political Corruption." Continuing coverage on the corruption scandal from the Anchorage Daily News.
 "Veco." Continuing coverage about VECO Corporation from the Anchorage Daily News, with particular emphasis on VECO's connections to the corruption scandal.
 Pete Kott at 100 Years of Alaska's Legislature

1949 births
Living people
American construction businesspeople
Businesspeople from Anchorage, Alaska
Florida International University alumni
Politicians from Anchorage, Alaska
Politicians convicted of extortion under color of official right
Politicians convicted of mail and wire fraud
Politicians convicted of program bribery
Politicians from Flint, Michigan
Military personnel from Michigan
Speakers of the Alaska House of Representatives
Republican Party members of the Alaska House of Representatives
United States Air Force officers
Alaska politicians convicted of crimes
20th-century American politicians
21st-century American politicians